Hubli-Dharwad Central Assembly constituency is one of the 224 Legislative Assembly constituencies of Karnataka state in India.

It is part of Dharwad district.

Members of the Legislative Assembly 
Source

Election results

2018

See also
 List of constituencies of the Karnataka Legislative Assembly
 Dharwad district

References

Dharwad district
Assembly constituencies of Karnataka